Jack Firth (27 June 1917 – 7 September 1981) was an English first-class cricketer, who played eight games for Yorkshire County Cricket Club in 1949 and 1950, and 223 matches for Leicestershire from 1951 to 1958. He also appeared in two games for the Minor Counties in 1950, and two more for the M.C.C. in 1954.

Born in Cottingley, Yorkshire, England, Firth was a specialist wicket-keeper, who took 373 catches and completed 95 stumpings in his 235 first-class games. A right-handed lower order batsman, he also scored 3,588 runs at 14.58, with a best of 90 not out against Essex.

He was awarded his Leicestershire cap in 1951, and his Leicestershire benefit season was held in 1958.

Firth died in September 1981 in Cottingley.

References

External links
Cricinfo Profile
Cricket Archive Statistics

1917 births
1981 deaths
Yorkshire cricketers
Leicestershire cricketers
People from Cottingley, Bradford
English cricketers
Marylebone Cricket Club cricketers
Minor Counties cricketers
Sportspeople from Yorkshire
Wicket-keepers